LÉ Macha was a ship in the Irish Naval Service.

HMS Borage
She served as escort for the Arctic convoys from 1942-1945 before being sold to Ireland.

LÉ Macha

In September 1948, she had the honour of carrying the remains of William Butler Yeats from France to Drumcliffe, County Sligo, for reburial.  There was a funeral march from Nice to the ship with band, trumpeters and military honours from a company of French alpine troops. It was the first time that France rendered military honours to a civilian. The remains were received at Rocquebrune near Nice by Sean Murphy, the Irish Ambassador to France.

The voyage home took 17 days.  LÉ Macha stopped en route at Gibraltar and in France. The ship returned to Galway, whence the remains were carried by hearse to their final resting place in County Sligo.

LÉ Macha was sold for scrap on 22 November 1970.

References

 

1941 ships
Former naval ships of the Republic of Ireland
Flower-class corvettes of the Irish Naval Service